Cambridge Common is a public park and National Historic Landmark in Cambridge, Massachusetts, United States. It is located near Harvard Square and borders on several parts of Harvard University. The north end of the park has a large playground. The park is maintained by the Cambridge Department of Public Works.

History 
In the colonial period, Cambridge Common served as a pasture on which animals grazed. It was also used as a military training ground. It originally extended from what is now Linnaean Street in the north all the way south to Harvard Square between Massachusetts Avenue and Garden Street.

Public executions took place in the northern portion of this space, known as Gallows Hill, located today west of Massachusetts Avenue around Lancaster Street. Executed at this site on September 22, 1755, were two enslaved people, Mark and Phillis, who were both accused and convicted of poisoning their master, John Codman of Charlestown. Phillis was burned at the stake, and Mark was killed by hanging on gallows some ten yards away from the stake. His body was subsequently exhibited publicly for decades in Charlestown, such that even Paul Revere remembered passing by its site while on his famous ride. Phillis was later described by a newspaper as "the last recorded victim" of this punishment in New England.

Legend has it that George Washington took command of the Continental Army in a ceremony underneath the Washington Elm. Yet historical research suggests no such ceremony took place.

The current space was not enclosed until 1830.

Barracks were constructed on the common during World War I as the Navy Department built structures for its Radio School on the grounds.

Cambridge Common has long been a site for public gatherings in which groups met before marching to Boston Common as part of protests for Civil Rights or against the Vietnam War.

Matt Damon recalled how Ben Affleck helped him in a fight during a football game on the Common in the mid-1980s.

Monuments and memorials

A commemorative plaque marks the location of the Washington Elm, a tree under which legend claims Washington stood as he first assumed command of the Continental Army. Nearby is a trio of bronze cannons, a plaque for Henry Knox, and another for Tadeusz Kościuszko.

In the northeast corner is the Statue of John Bridge, also known as The Puritan, by Thomas Ridgeway Gould.

Slightly southeast of the center of the Common is a memorial to the American Civil War with a statue of Abraham Lincoln in a covered area near the base of the memorial.  On top of the memorial is a statue of a soldier.

Cambridge Common is also the site of an Irish Famine Memorial, dedicated on July 23, 1997, by then President of Ireland, Mary Robinson, and unveiled to an audience of 3,000 people. The Memorial sculpture was created by Maurice Harron, a sculptor from Derry, Northern Ireland. There is a similar memorial in downtown Boston.

Gallery

See also
 Cambridge Common Historic District
 Statue of John Bridge
Common land
 Washington Gate

References

Cambridge Common Irish Famine Memorial (archived 2007)

Harvard Square
Historic districts on the National Register of Historic Places in Massachusetts
National Register of Historic Places in Cambridge, Massachusetts
Parks in Middlesex County, Massachusetts
Tourist attractions in Cambridge, Massachusetts
Urban public parks